FabricLive.42 is a 2008 mix album by Freq Nasty. The album was released as part of the FabricLive Mix Series.

Track listing
Saul Williams - Not in our Name - Pledge of Resistance - Ninja Tune
Santogold vs Switch & Freq Nasty - Creator - Warners
Freq Nasty vs Propa Tings - Peacemaker - Freq Nasty
Madox - Duckalicious (Baobinga's Thugalicious Remix) - Expanded
Leon Jean-Marie - Bring it On (Rusko's Granny Smasher Remix) - Universal
Reso - If you can’t Beat Em - Civil Music
Cadence Weapon - House Music - Big Dada
L-Vis 1990 - Change the Game - Tres Cool
ZZT - Lower State of Consciousness (Original Munich Version) - Turbo
Rob Sparx - 2 Faced Rasta (Reso Remix) - Dubting
Lee "Scratch" Perry vs The Moody Boyz - God Smiled (Remix) - On-U Sound
Tayo - March of the Soundbwoyz - Cool & Deadly/Supercharged
Freq Nasty - Come Let Me Know (Acappella) - Skint
Baobinga ft. DJ Nasty - State of Ghetto Jackin  - Trouble & Bass
Epydemix - Thunder Gutter (Dub) - Epydemix
Backdraft ft. Sporty-O - Living Like a Hustler - Passenger
KRS-One - Sound of da Police (Freq Nasty Breakbeat Bacon Mix) - Zomba
The Beat Monkeys - How you Like me Now? (Rico Tubbs Gangsters Mix) - Passenger
Buraka Som Sistema - Kaslemba Wegue Wegue (Reso’s Aguadente Mash Mix) - Enchufada
Freq Nasty vs Heavyweight Dub Champion - Snared (Freq's Donkey Kong Mix) - Giveback
TRG - Oi! Killa ! - Cool & Deadly/Supercharged
Freq Nasty vs Bassnectar - Viva Tibet (Dub) - Giveback
Radioclit vs No Surrender - Godda get It - No Surrender/Ghettopop Records 2007
Nate Mars ft. Jahdan - Above & Beyond Dem - Complex Dubz

Critical reception

The album was positively received by critics, with Artistdirect giving its 4.5 out of 5, calling it music "you throw on when the only passengers in your car are two recently emptied cans of Red Bull and a woofer". Remix called it a "wild romp through present-day breaks and bass".  Rick Anderson of Allmusic stated "each track comes across as fairly unexpected: you know it's going to be funky, you know the beats are probably going to lurch around crazily with lots of squelchy synth and frequent reggae vocal samples, but beyond that there's no telling what's going to happen. At its best, the result is thrilling".

References

External links
Fabric: FabricLive.42

Fabric (club) albums
2008 compilation albums